Eugoa rufibasis is a moth of the subfamily Arctiinae first described by Jeremy Daniel Holloway in 2001. It is found on Borneo. The habitat consists of coastal forests.

The length of the forewings is 7 mm.

References

Moths described in 2001
rufibasis